Insult is a 1932 British drama film directed by Harry Lachman and starring Elizabeth Allan, John Gielgud and Hugh Williams. It is an adaptation of a play by Jean Fabricus. It is a melodrama set in the French Foreign Legion in North Africa.

Cast
 Elizabeth Allan as Pola Dubois 
 John Gielgud as Henri Dubois 
 Hugh Williams as Captain Ramon Nadir 
 Sam Livesey as Major Dubois 
 Sydney Fairbrother as Arabella 
 Abraham Sofaer as Ali Ben Achmed 
 Edgar Norfolk as Captain Jean Conte 
 Hal Gordon as Sergeant 
 Dinah Gilly as Singer

References

Bibliography
 Low, Rachael. Filmmaking in 1930s Britain. George Allen & Unwin, 1985.
 Wood, Linda. British Films, 1927-1939. British Film Institute, 1986.

External links
 

1932 films
Films directed by Harry Lachman
1932 drama films
British drama films
British black-and-white films
1930s English-language films
1930s British films